The Bamboos may refer to:

 The Bamboos (rock band), 1980s alternative rock band from Perth, Australia
 The Bamboos (funk band), 2000s deep funk band from Melbourne, Australia
 Bamboo (Filipino band), 2000s alternative rock band from Manila, Philippines

See also  
 Bamboo (disambiguation)